M30 or M-30 may refer to:

Science
 Messier 30 (M30), a globular cluster in the constellation Capricornus

Transportation

Vehicles
 BMW M30, a 1968 automobile piston engine
 HMS M30, a 1915 British Royal Navy vessel of World War 1
 Infiniti M30, a luxury coupe sold in the United States
 M30, the pennant number for the Royal Navy ship, HMS Ledbury
 M-30, the Charomskiy ACh-30 diesel engine
 Miles M.30, British, experimental aircraft developed during World War II
 McLaren M30, 1980 racing car
Mälar 30, sailboat class

Roads
 M-30 (Michigan highway), a state highway in southern Michigan
 M30 motorway, a Madrid orbital motorway in Spain
 M30 motorway (Hungary), a motorway in Hungary
 M30 (Cape Town), a Metropolitan Route in Cape Town, South Africa
 M30 (Johannesburg), a Metropolitan Route in Johannesburg, South Africa
 Highway M30 (Ukraine)
 M30 (Pretoria), a Metropolitan Route in Pretoria, South Africa
 M30 (Durban), a Metropolitan Route in Durban, South Africa
 M30 (Bloemfontein), a Metropolitan Route in Bloemfontein, South Africa
 M30 (Pietermaritzburg), a Metropolitan Route in Pietermaritzburg, South Africa

Other
 M30 (New York City bus), a former New York City Bus route in Manhattan

Weapons
 A type of US rocket used by the M142 and M270 Multiple Launch Rocket Systems
 A rocket fired by the Soviet Katyusha rocket launcher
 M30 107 mm Mortar, an American heavy mortar
 M-30 122 mm howitzer, a Soviet howitzer
 M30 Luftwaffe drilling, a World War II-era, survival combination gun